Amadou Konaté (born 1 January 1997) is a French footballer who plays as a forward for Poissy.

Club career
Konaté made his professional debut with Valenciennes FC in a 2–1 Ligue 2 loss to LB Châteauroux on 12 January 2018, wherein he was subbed on in the last minute of the game. On 29 March 2019 Konaté signed for Norwegian club Bodø/Glimt on a four-year contract. In January 2020, having made only four appearances for the Norwegian side, he was loaned back to France, to Championnat National side AS Lyon Duchère until the end of 2019–20 season. Due to the premature end of the season, he only made two appearances with Lyon Duchère before signing with another Championnat National side SO Cholet in August 2020.

On 10 July 2022, Konaté signed with Poissy in Championnat National 2.

Personal life
Born in France, Konaté is of Malian descent.

Career statistics

Club

References

External links
 
 

1997 births
Living people
Association football forwards
French footballers
French people of Malian descent
Valenciennes FC players
US Boulogne players
FK Bodø/Glimt players
Lyon La Duchère players
SO Cholet players
FC Sète 34 players
AS Poissy players
Ligue 2 players
Championnat National players
Championnat National 3 players
Eliteserien players
French expatriate footballers
Expatriate footballers in Norway
French expatriate sportspeople in Norway